Meso Island is an island in the Detroit River. It is in Wayne County, in southeast Michigan.
Numerous types of fish spawn at the island; a 1982 report by the U.S. Fish and Wildlife Service listed
northern pike,
carp,
bullhead catfish,
rock bass,
and bluegill.

References

Islands of Wayne County, Michigan
Islands of the Detroit River
River islands of Michigan
Michigan populated places on the Detroit River